Pyrazinoic acid is a pyrazinamide metabolite.

Possible role in tuberculosis treatment
Pyrazinamid is currently used as a treatment for tuberculosis. Mycobacterium tuberculosis converts pyrazinamid into pyrazinoic acid. The use of pyrazinoic acid has been investigated as a possible treatment for pyrazinamid resistant strains of Mycobacterium tuberculosis.
It has been shown that the  MICs of esters of pyrazinoic acid are lower, therefore they are more potent antibiotics. Moreover they cross the bacterial membrane more easily, due to their higher lipophilicity.

Derivatives/uses
It is a part of the bortezomib molecule.

References

Pyrazines
Aromatic acids